Kolenchery is a town and the easternmost suburb of the city of Kochi in Kerala, India. Located on National Highway 49 (NH 49), it is situated around 22 km (13 mi) from the city centre.

St. Peter's and St. Paul's Orthodox Syrian Church, Kolenchery is an ancient and historic church at Kolenchery, built by one Thankan of the Kolenchery House in the 6th century.  Thomb of Marthoma 7 Metropolitan of Malankara Sabha situated in this Historical Church St. Peter's College in the town has conducted botanical research. St Peter's Higher Secondary School, St Peter's Vocational Higher Secondary School, St Peter's High School, TTC, BEd College, MOSC Medical College, etc Situated in nature beauty City

Location

https://www.google.ca/maps/place/Kolenchery,+Kerala,+India/@9.9788888,76.4670205,15z/data=!3m1!4b1!4m5!3m4!1s0x3b07e00a819b1b6b:0x6faa68d0ce73d422!8m2!3d9.9796536!4d76.4730796?hl=en

References

External links

Cities and towns in Ernakulam district
Suburbs of Kochi

https://www.google.ca/search?q=kolenchery+kerala&sxsrf=ALiCzsYOKZNDlmGthIi1HgGjws6HuBSe5w:1665703226376&source=lnms&tbm=isch&sa=X&ved=2ahUKEwiuz--IrN76AhXoLzQIHR8aBtQQ_AUoA3oECAIQBQ&biw=1290&bih=717&dpr=1.75
https://www.stpeterscollege.ac.in/